Immokalee Regional Airport  is a public use airport located one nautical mile (2 km) northeast of the central business district of Immokalee, in Collier County, Florida, United States. The airport is owned by the Collier County Airport Authority. Formerly known as Immokalee Airport, it is included in the National Plan of Integrated Airport Systems for 2011–2015, which categorized it as a general aviation facility.

History 
It was established as Immokalee Army Airfield, and activated on July 5, 1942. It was assigned to United States Army Air Forces East Coast Training Center (later Eastern Training Command). It was an auxiliary to Hendricks Army Airfield and was an AAF Specialized Pilot Training School (4-Engine) for B-17 and B-24 heavy bombers. The airfield also provided flexible gunnery training for Buckingham Army Airfield near Fort Myers.

It was transferred to Third Air Force in July 1944 with the drawdown of AAFTC's pilot training program and was a group training facility for replacement personnel. It became an auxiliary of the Sarasota Army Airfield replacement fighter pilot training school.

The airfield was declared surplus and turned over to the Army Corps of Engineers on September 30, 1945. It was eventually discharged to the War Assets Administration and became a civil airport.

Facilities and aircraft 
Immokalee Regional Airport covers an area of 1,330 acres (538 ha) at an elevation of 37 feet (11 m) above mean sea level. It has two asphalt paved runways, designated 9/27 and 18/36. 9/27 is 5,000 x 100 feet (1,524 x 30 m) and 18/36 is 5,000 x 150 feet (1,524 x 46 m).

For the 12-month period ending October 22, 2013, the airport had 36,500 general aviation aircraft operations, an average of 100 per day. At that time there were 60 aircraft based at this airport: 45 single-engine, 9 multi-engine, 4 jet, and 2 helicopter.

See also 

 Florida World War II Army Airfields

References

External links 
 
 Immokalee Regional Airport at Collier County website
  brochure from CFASPP
 Aerial image as of February 1999 from USGS The National Map
 

Airports in Florida
Transportation buildings and structures in Collier County, Florida
Airfields of the United States Army Air Forces in Florida
Airports established in 1943
1943 establishments in Florida